Mukta A2 Cinemas is one of the Cinema chains in India;fully owned and operated by Mukta Arts Ltd. The company began its commercial operations in July 2011 with the launch in Vadodara city, Gujarat, India. Subhash Ghai (Founder, Mukta Arts Ltd.) started this cinema chain to connect better with the audience.

Philosophy 
Mukta A2 CINEMAS, was formed in year 2016 as a fully owned subsidiary of Mukta Arts Ltd and currently a fast growing cinema chain in India was founded by Mr. Subhash Ghai, the Showman of Bollywood, one of the most prominent Film Directors in India, with an aim to provide a Multiplex experience at affordable prices, the company is currently present in 20 locations with 48 screens and an International presence with a 6 screen Multiplex in the Kingdom of Bahrain.

Mukta A2 Cinemas provides its patrons with state-of-the-art sound, 3-D & picture quality with comfortable seating, a soothing ambience and a sumptuous array of food & beverages. The cinemas offer a high standard of services that are upheld by a young and dynamic team of professionals with a strong background in the exhibition industry.

In FY 16-17, the cinema chain started a fully owned & operated Multiplex in the city of Manama, Bahrain, making it the first Indian exhibitor to start operations in the Middle East and the only Indian cinema chain to build & operate its own cinemas internationally.

In 2017, it formed a Joint Venture company with South India's renowned Asian Cinemas to build and operate single screens across South India. As a part of this agreement, the cinema chain has already commenced operations in some markets across the southern circuit like Gangavathi, Thandur, Nizamabad,Sadashivpeth, and Kothagude.

Targeting over a 100 screens by the end of FY 2018, Mukta A2 Cinemas has initiated projects in markets like Pune, Gurgaon, Nainital, Cheeka, Surat, and is also expanding its base in its existing markets including cities like Mumbai, Ahmedabad and Hyderabad.

Locations
List of Mukta A2 Cinemas multiplexes across India:

The chain is coming up with more properties and expanding its presence. Soon Mukta A2 Cinemas will be seen in Pune, Raipur, Vapi etc.

In September 2016, the chain expanded its presence in International Markets, with their first Multiplex in the Kingdom of Bahrain, where Mukta A2 Cinemas were established in Juffair Mall.

See also

 Subhash Ghai
 Mukta Arts

References

External links
Mukta A2 Cinemas Official Website
Mukta A2 Cinemas YouTube

Cinema chains in India